Georgiana Molloy Anglican School is an independent Anglican co-educational primary and secondary day school located in Yalyalup, Western Australia, a suburb of Busselton, and is named after the notable early Western Australian settler Georgiana Molloy. The school was established in 2003 under the guidance of Tom Wilmot, who recognised the need for an Anglican School on "the Cape".

School development 

In 2007 the school finished Stage 3 of the development process representing a 6 million investment, and involving the construction of six classrooms, two science laboratories, wood and metal workshops, two information and communications technology laboratories, specialist facilities for music, art and drama, staff preparation areas and student amenities, meeting rooms, and an undercover activity area.

In 2010 the school received 3.5 million funding as part of the Building Education Revolution program to construct a Multi-purpose Activity Centre (commonly referred to as the 'MAC'), with a seating capacity of over 1,500 and two full-sized courts inside which can accommodate a multitude of sports such as basketball, indoor soccer, hockey and badminton. The complex was completed in early 2012.

See also 
 St Mary's Anglican Church, Busselton

References

External links 
 Georgiana Molloy official homepage

Anglican primary schools in Western Australia
Anglican Schools Commission
Anglican secondary schools in Western Australia
Educational institutions established in 2003
Busselton
2003 establishments in Australia